The Cremifaniidae are a very small family of acalyptrate flies with only 4 described species worldwide. All species are considered rare, and nothing is known of their life history. They were formerly placed in the family Chamaemyiidae.

Classification
There is only one genus in the family.

genus Cremifania Czerny, 1904
C. bulgarica Papp, 2010
C. lanceolata Papp, 1994
C. nearctica McAlpine, 1963
C. nigrocellulata Czerny, 1904

References

 
Brachycera families